Lutes Mountain is a Canadian Community, located in Westmorland County, New Brunswick. It is named after famous railroad conductor, Neil Lutes. The Community is situated in southeastern New Brunswick, to the North West of Moncton, located partially within Moncton and Magnetic Hill Limits.  Lutes Mountain is located around the intersection of New Brunswick Route 126 and New Brunswick Route 128.

History

Lutes Mountain was settled about 1811 by members of the Lutes family, part of a group of German settlers from the state of Pennsylvania who moved to the Petitcodiac region in 1765: PO 1859–1936 with Jeremiah Lutes as the first postmaster: included Moncton Mountain, Mountain Settlement and Jones Road Settlement: in 1866 Lutes Mountain was a farming community with approximately 65 families, including the families of Abraham Lutes, Harden Lutes, James Lutes, Jeremiah Lutes, John N. Lutes, Rufus Lutes and William Lutes: in 1871 it had a population of 300: in 1898 Lutes Mountain was a farming settlement with post office, 1 store, 1 grist mill, 1 shingle mill, 1 cheese factory, 2 churches and a population of approximately 500: Lutes Mountain is now partially within the city of Moncton.

Places of note

Lutes Mountain Church of the Nazarene
Lutes Mountain Meeting House
Lyons Country Store
Magnetic Hill School
Stonehurst Campground

Notable people

See also
List of communities in New Brunswick
Greater Moncton
List of entertainment events in Greater Moncton

References

Communities in Westmorland County, New Brunswick
Communities in Greater Moncton